This article lists the election results and representation of the Democratic Unionist Party with respect to the House of Commons of the United Kingdom,

House of Commons

Northern Ireland Assembly election results

European Parliament election results

References

representation and election results
Election results by party in the United Kingdom